René Israel Nyman (21 November 1916 in Helsinki, Finland – 19 May 1997 in Helsinki, Finland) was a Finnish Olympic sailor in the Dragon, Star, and O-Jolle classes. He competed in the 1936 Summer Olympics, 1948 Summer Olympics, 1952 Summer Olympics and the 1960 Summer Olympics

References

Olympic sailors of Finland
Finnish male sailors (sport)
Star class sailors
Dragon class sailors
O-Jolle class sailors
Sailors at the 1936 Summer Olympics – O-Jolle
Sailors at the 1948 Summer Olympics – Star
Sailors at the 1952 Summer Olympics – Star
Sailors at the 1960 Summer Olympics – Dragon
1916 births
1997 deaths
Sportspeople from Helsinki